The 1971–72 NBA season was the Warriors' 26th season in the NBA, the first as the Golden State Warriors in Oakland, and 10th in the San Francisco Bay Area. This was also their only season to play a few home games in San Diego, as part of a brief attempt to represent the whole state of California.

Offseason

Draft picks

Roster

Regular season

Season standings

z – clinched division title
y – clinched division title
x – clinched playoff spot

Record vs. opponents

Game log

Playoffs

|- align="center" bgcolor="#ccffcc"
| 1
| March 28
| @ Milwaukee
| W 117–106
| Jim Barnett (30)
| Nate Thurmond (20)
| Thurmond, Mullins (9)
| Milwaukee Arena9,877
| 1–0
|- align="center" bgcolor="#ffcccc"
| 2
| March 30
| @ Milwaukee
| L 93–118
| Nate Thurmond (32)
| Thurmond, Lee (18)
| Thurmond, Barnett (5)
| Milwaukee Arena10,746
| 1–1
|- align="center" bgcolor="#ffcccc"
| 3
| April 1
| Milwaukee
| L 94–122
| Nate Thurmond (21)
| Nate Thurmond (21)
| Jim Barnett (7)
| Oakland–Alameda County Coliseum Arena13,502
| 1–2
|- align="center" bgcolor="#ffcccc"
| 4
| April 4
| Milwaukee
| L 99–106
| Jim Barnett (29)
| Clyde Lee (16)
| Jeff Mullins (6)
| Oakland–Alameda County Coliseum Arena12,986
| 1–3
|- align="center" bgcolor="#ffcccc"
| 5
| April 6
| @ Milwaukee
| L 100–108
| Nate Thurmond (26)
| Nate Thurmond (15)
| Nate Thurmond (7)
| Milwaukee Arena10,746
| 1–4
|-

Awards and records
 Nate Thurmond, NBA All-Defensive Second Team

References

Golden State
Golden State Warriors seasons
Golden
Golden